Luis Antonio Marín Barahona (born 18 May 1983) is a Chilean football goalkeeper who plays for Chilean Primera División club Deportes Temuco.

Career
Marin began his professional career playing for Audax Italiano from 2003 to 2006, and later in 2007 he joined Lota Schwager. In 2008, Marín was signed by Unión Española. His performances at Unión led to being selected for the Chile national football team to play in the 2010 FIFA World Cup.

In January 2011 he signed for O'Higgins and was captain of the team, reaching the 2012 Torneo Apertura final lost with Universidad de Chile on the penalty shoot-out, club which Marín signed a two-year loan in 2013.

On 18 December 2014, after he finished contract with Universidad de Chile, Marin signed for Sporting Kansas City of Major League Soccer. After playing Sporting KC's first eight matches (2–2–4) of 2015 with 19 saves, three shutouts and a 1.50 goals against average, Marin agreed to terminate his contract on 27 May.

On 3 June 2015, he returned his country for join Palestino.

International career
He received his first call up to play for Chile in May 2010 against Trinidad and Tobago, performing well in a 2–0 win at Iquique. After appearing in a 0–0 draw with Venezuela at Temuco and once in the 2010 FIFA World Cup provisional list, against Mexico, he finally was included in the 23-man list by Marcelo Bielsa to represents Chile at South Africa.

Honours

Club
Universidad de Chile
Primera División de Chile: 2014 Apertura

Individual
Chile
Medalla Bicentenario: 2010

References

External links
 
 

1983 births
Living people
Chilean footballers
Chilean expatriate footballers
Chilean expatriate sportspeople in the United States
Chile international footballers
2010 FIFA World Cup players
Association football goalkeepers
Audax Italiano footballers
Lota Schwager footballers
Unión Española footballers
O'Higgins F.C. footballers
Santiago Wanderers footballers
Universidad de Chile footballers
Sporting Kansas City players
Deportes Temuco footballers
Club Deportivo Palestino footballers
Chilean Primera División players
Major League Soccer players
Expatriate soccer players in the United States
Sportspeople from Valparaíso
Canal del Fútbol color commentators
Chilean association football commentators